"Tiny Explosions" is a single by the post-grunge band The Presidents of the United States of America. It was the lead off-single for the Presidents' reunion album Freaked Out and Small.

Track listing

Original CD single
 "Tiny Explosions" - 2:50
 "Tiny Explosions" (live)
 "I'm Mad" (live)
 "Headin' Out" (live)

Second CD single
 "Tiny Explosions" - 2:50
 "Tiny Explosions" (live)
 "I'm Mad" (live)
 "Headin' Out" (live)
 "Tiny Explosions" video

2000 singles
The Presidents of the United States of America (band) songs
2000 songs
Songs written by Chris Ballew